Al Najaf International Airport (IATA:  NJF; ICAO: ORNI) is the airport serving Najaf, Iraq, and is located on the eastern side of the city. The airport is expanding to provide four departure gates, two arrival gates, immigration and passenger services.

History
On 20 July 2008 the Najaf Authorities hosted the ceremonial opening attended by the Iraqi Prime Minister Nouri Al-Maliki who stepped out of the first official plane.

The Najaf Governorate represented by the Deputy Governor Abd al-Husayn Abtan and Najaf Investment Commission signed a Memorandum of Agreement dated 24 June 2008 with Al-Aqeelah Holding authorizing it for one year to finalize the construction of the airport and five years subject to renewal to manage the airport. Currently Aqeeq Aviation Holding a subsidiary of Al-Aqeelah Holding is overseeing this.

The construction phase comprises the construction of the VIP lounge, Arrival and Departure Halls, Taxiway, Air cargo, purchasing all airport equipments including Ground Handling Equipments, technical supplies, Navigation Aids, Dining Facilities and lodging sites for employees.

Since 2009, more airlines have begun service to Najaf, including Gulf Air, Middle East Airlines, Qatar Airways, Syrian Air and Turkish Airlines.

Airlines and destinations

References

Najaf
Airports in Iraq
2008 establishments in Iraq
Airports established in 2008